Floating may refer to:

 a type of dental work performed on horse teeth
 use of an isolation tank
 the guitar-playing technique where chords are sustained rather than scratched
 Floating (play), by Hugh Hughes
 Floating (psychological phenomenon), slipping into altered states
 Floating exchange rate, a market-valued currency
 Floating voltage, and floating ground, a voltage or ground in an electric circuit that is not connected to the Earth or another reference voltage
 Floating point, a representation in computing of rational numbers most commonly associated with the IEEE 754 standard
 Floating (film), a 1997 American drama film

Albums and songs 
 Floating (Eloy album) (1974)
 Floating (Ketil Bjørnstad album) (2005)
 Floating (EP), a 1991 EP by Bill Callahan
 "Floating" (The Moody Blues song) (1969)
 "Floating" (Megan Rochell song) (2006)
 "Floating" (Jape song) (2004)
 "Floating", a song by Jolin Tsai from the 2000 album Don't Stop
 "Floating", an instrumental song by Roddy Ellias from the 1974 Canadian promo album: "CBC Radio Canada Broadcast Recording LM 402"
 "Floatin", a 2018 song by Uncle Kracker
 "Floating", a song by Schoolboy Q featuring 21 Savage from the 2019 album Crash Talk

See also 
 Float (disambiguation)
 Flotation (disambiguation)
 Buoyancy